Helsingin Jalkapalloklubi is a Finnish women's football team representing HJK Helsinki in the Kansallinen Liiga. 

HJK is the championship's most successful team by a large margin, having won 22 titles between 1971 (its founding year) and 2005. The team enjoyed their best winning streak between 1995 and 2001. The following HJK reached the semifinals of the inaugural edition of the UEFA Women's Cup, their best result in three appearances in the competition. 

In the subsequent six years from 2005 it has failed to win the championship, finishing either 2nd, 3rd or 4th. However, it has been more successful in the national Cup, including three titles in a row between 2006–08.

Honours

Official
 23 Finnish Leagues (1971, 1972, 1973, 1974, 1975, 1979, 1980, 1981, 1984, 1986, 1987, 1988, 1991, 1992, 1995, 1996, 1997, 1998, 1999, 2000, 2001, 2005, 2019
 17 Finnish Cups (1981, 1984, 1985, 1986, 1991, 1992, 1993, 1998, 1999, 2000, 2002, 2006, 2007, 2008, 2010, 2017, 2019)

Invitational
 2 Menton Tournaments (1987, 1988)

Record in UEFA competitions

Current squad
As of 16 April 2022.

Former internationals

  Susanna Heikari
  Laura Kalmari
  Annika Kukkonen
  Maureen Jacobson
  Anne Mäkinen
  Pauliina Miettinen
  Essi Sainio
  Tiina Salmén
  Marieanne Spacey
  Sanna Talonen
  Louise Waller

References

Women's football clubs in Finland
Association football clubs established in 1971
Helsingin Jalkapalloklubi
Football clubs in Helsinki
1971 establishments in Finland
Women in Helsinki